The Epstein–Barr virus viral-capsid antigen (EBV-VCA) is the viral protein that forms the viral capsid of the Epstein–Barr virus. It is the antigen targeted by antibodies that bond to viral capsid antigens (VCA). Such antibodies can be used in serology to diagnose infectious mononucleosis. In cases with primary infection, the sensitivity of IgG antibody and IgM antibody anti-VCA testing has been estimated to be 100% reliable.

Elevated Anti-VCA IgM indicates acute infection.

Elevated Anti-VCA IgG indicates prior infection.

References

Epstein–Barr virus